Moshirabad may refer to:
 Moshirabad, Heris, East Azerbaijan Province
 Moshirabad, Tabriz, East Azerbaijan Province
 Moshirabad, Bijar, Kurdistan Province
 Moshirabad-e Owriyeh, Kurdistan Province
 Moshirabad-e Panjeh, Kurdistan Province
 Moshirabad, West Azerbaijan